Henri-Charles Puech (20 July 1902, Montpellier – 11 January 1986, aged 83) was a French historian who long held the chair of History of religions at the Collège de France from 1952 to 1972.

Biography 
A philosopher by training, he was interested in Greek philosophy, especially in hermeticism and neoplatonism, before turning to the study of Christian doctrines of the early centuries, a discipline he long taught in the École pratique des hautes études. 
His teaching had a great influence on the development of patristics studies in the second half of the twentieth in France. But it is primarily as a result of the discovery of new documents in the study of Manichaeism and the various systems of Gnostic thought that he gained international recognition.

A long collaborator of the  before he directed it, he presided the Association internationale pour l'étude de l'histoire des religions from 1950 to 1965.

Honours 
 Officier of the Légion d'honneur (1963) 
 Commandeur of the Ordre of the Palmes académiques (1965)
 Commandeur of the Ordre national du Mérite (1969)

Work 
1970: Histoire des religions, 3 vol., Éditions Gallimard
1978: En quête de la gnose, Paris, Gallimard, series "Bibliothèque des Sciences Humaines", 2 volumes Tome 1 : La Gnose et le Temps. Tome 2 : Sur l'évangile selon Thomas
1979: Sur le manichéisme et autres essais, Paris, Flammarion, series "Idées et recherches"

External links 
 Henri-Charles Puech on the site of the collège de France
 Notice sur la vie et les travaux d'Henri-Charles Puech, membre de l'Académie on Persée 
 Puech, Henri-Charles on E. Universalis
 Allocution de M. Henri-Charles Puech, président on Persée

Lycée Louis-le-Grand alumni
École Normale Supérieure alumni
20th-century French historians
French historians of religion
Historians of Gnosticism
Academic staff of the Collège de France
Academic staff of the École pratique des hautes études
Officiers of the Légion d'honneur
Commandeurs of the Ordre des Palmes Académiques
Commanders of the Ordre national du Mérite
Fellows of the British Academy
Members of the Académie des Inscriptions et Belles-Lettres
Writers from Montpellier
1902 births
1986 deaths
Corresponding Fellows of the British Academy